The grey-hooded warbler (Phylloscopus xanthoschistos) is a species of leaf warbler (family Phylloscopidae). It is most famous for the way it warbles. It was formerly included in the "Old World warbler" assemblage.

It is found in the Himalayas. Its natural habitat is temperate forests.

References

grey-hooded warbler
Birds of the Himalayas
Birds of Eastern Himalaya
grey-hooded warbler
grey-hooded warbler
grey-hooded warbler
Taxonomy articles created by Polbot